The Herman L. Humphrey House is located in Hudson, Wisconsin, United States. It was the home of U.S. Representative Herman L. Humphrey. The house was added to the National Register of Historic Places in 1984.

It is a two-story brick Italianate-style house on a stone foundation.

References

Houses completed in 1860
Houses in St. Croix County, Wisconsin
Houses on the National Register of Historic Places in Wisconsin
Italianate architecture in Wisconsin
National Register of Historic Places in St. Croix County, Wisconsin